Arnold William Klein (February 27, 1945 – October 22, 2015) was an American dermatologist.

In the infancy of the AIDS epidemic, Klein became one of the first doctors in Los Angeles to diagnose a case of Kaposi's sarcoma in a young patient. He also worked closely with American pop musician Michael Jackson, diagnosing him with discoid lupus erythematosus and vitiligo and supplying him with over 200 shots of demerol, aiding his addiction, starting in the mid-1980s.

Early life and education 
Klein was born on February 27, 1945, in Mt. Clemens, Michigan, the son of a Jewish Orthodox rabbi. He was raised in Michigan and North Miami, Florida, graduating from North Miami High School in 1963.

In 1967, Klein earned his bachelor's degree in biology from the University of Pennsylvania. He attended the University of Pennsylvania School of Medicine, earning his Doctor of Medicine degree in 1971. He completed an internship at Cedars-Sinai Medical Center in Los Angeles and his residency in dermatology at the University of Pennsylvania and the University of California at Los Angeles (UCLA). In 1975, he served as Chief Resident in Dermatology at UCLA.

Career 
Klein was an unpaid, volunteer professor of Medicine and Dermatology at the UCLA David Geffen School of Medicine.

Klein was an outspoken critic of the misuse of prescription drugs, toxins, and certain synthetic dermal fillers, including ArteFill. He was responsible for the FDA giving Allergan's Botox a black box warning. Klein was named a consultant to the FDA. He died on October 22, 2015 at the age of 70 at the Eisenhower Medical Center in Rancho Mirage, California.

Michael Jackson

Klein served as the dermatologist for Michael Jackson. Following Jackson's death, Klein claimed to be a sperm donor, but stated that he did not believe he was the biological father of Jackson's children. However, Klein had multiple health problems such as multiple sclerosis, which would've prevented him from donating sperm as sperm donors are not allowed to donate if they have genetic disorders or other medical concerns.

Board memberships 
In August 1985, Klein joined the board of the National AIDS Research Foundation (NARF). A month later, the Foundation merged with the AIDS Medical Association and are now known as amfAR.
, Klein was also a member of the Advisory Board of the AIDS Services Foundation Orange County, now known as Radiant Health Centers.

Over the next two decades, they additionally established the Elizabeth Taylor AIDS Foundation and Art for AIDS in Orange County.

In 2007, Klein founded The Elizabeth Taylor Endowment for the UCLA CARE Center, a facility that focuses on advancing HIV/AIDS research and treatment. In the November 2008 issue of L'Uomo Vogue, in an article related to AIDS in Africa, it was reported that Klein and the organizations which he founded have raised in excess of $274 million for HIV research and care.

Klein served as a trustee to various boards of directors, some of which included the Jennifer Jones-Simon Foundation and The Hereditary Disease Foundation. Klein, alongside his friend Frank Gehry, helped the foundation to raise funds and awareness for inherited diseases.

Klein also co-founded the Rose Tarlow-Arnold W. Klein Breast Cancer Foundation at UCLA which provides breast cancer treatment for individuals who are unable to afford it.

Honors and awards 
He received numerous awards and honors including Who's Who in the World, Best Doctors in America, Men of Achievement, AIDS Services Foundation of Orange County, Award of Merit, Los Angeles Magazine, The Best of L.A., Los Angeles Business Journal, 10 Masters of Medicine in Los Angeles, Haney Scholar, University of Pennsylvania, Inaugural Visiting Professor in Cosmetic Dermatology, Harvard School of Medicine, Inaugural Visiting Professor in Cosmetic Dermatology, University of Vermont, Measey Scholar, University of Pennsylvania, Philadelphia Foundation Fellow, Public Health Service Post – Doctoral Fellow, and Top Doctors of America.
In 2004, Klein was given a chair in his name at the UCLA Division of Dermatology.

Death
Klein died on October 22, 2015, at Eisenhower Medical Center in Rancho Mirage, California.

References

External links 

1945 births
2015 deaths
American dermatologists
Perelman School of Medicine at the University of Pennsylvania alumni
People from Mount Clemens, Michigan
Jewish American scientists
People from North Miami, Florida
21st-century American Jews